Sean Seymour-Cole (born 2 June 1966), also known as Sean Cole, is a British former professional tennis player.

Biography
Cole competed in the men's single and doubles main draws at the 1993 Wimbledon Championships, as a wildcard in both. He lost in four sets to Arnaud Boetsch in the first round of the singles and partnered Miles Maclagan in the doubles, also for a first round exit.

At Challenger level he won one title, the doubles at Kakegawa, Japan in 1991, partnering Irishman Eoin Collins. He was also runner-up in five Challenger doubles finals.

He now works as a physiotherapist in London.

Challenger titles

Doubles: (1)

References

External links
 
 

1966 births
Living people
English male tennis players
Tennis people from Surrey
British male tennis players